Archips termias, the apple leafroller, is a moth of the family Tortricidae. It is found in Vietnam, India, Nepal and China.

Larvae have been recorded feeding on Acacia nilotica, Citrus, Rosa, Coffea liberica, Malus pumila, Malus sylvestris and Prunus persica. They roll the leaves of their host plant.

References

Moths described in 1918
Archips
Moths of Asia